Bartolommeo Torre was an Italian fresco painter of Arezzo, who active c. the beginning of the 17th century, and died young.

References

People from Arezzo
17th-century Italian painters
Italian male painters
Painters from Tuscany
Year of death unknown
Year of birth unknown